John Southcote may refer to:
 Sir John Southcote (died 1585), English judge and politician
 John Southcote (died 1556), English politician and landowner